Liravi-ye Jonubi Rural District is in Imam Hassan District of Deylam County, Bushehr province, Iran. At the census of 2006, its population was 1,763 in 401 households; there were 1,804 inhabitants in 460 households at the following census of 2011; and in the most recent census of 2016, the population of the rural district was 1,903 in 508 households. The largest of its 10 villages was Hesar, with 909 people.

References 

Rural Districts of Bushehr Province
Populated places in Deylam County